The Turku Philharmonic Orchestra (Finnish: Turun Filharmoninen Orkesteri) is a Finnish orchestra based in Turku, Finland. It is the oldest orchestra in Finland, and one of the world's oldest still active orchestras. The Turku Philharmonic is resident at the Turku Concert Hall, the first purpose-built concert hall in Finland, completed in 1952.

The orchestra was founded in 1790 under the name Turun Soitannollinen Seura (Musical Society of Turku).  In 1927, the municipality of Turku took ownership of the ensemble, with Tauno Hannikainen as the orchestra's first chief conductor under municipal management.  The orchestra roster currently numbers 74 musicians.

Since January 2012, the orchestra's principal conductor is Leif Segerstam. The orchestra's current resident composer is Mikko Heiniö.

The orchestra released its first commercial recording in 1979.  It has since recorded commercially for such labels as Ondine, Finlandia, and Naxos Records.  With Segerstam, the orchestra has released a series of albums for Naxos of the music of Jean Sibelius.  The orchestra began to release monthly streaming videos of selected concerts in September 2016.

Principal conductors
 Tauno Hannikainen (1927–1928)
 Toivo Haapanen (1928–1929)
 Tauno Hannikainen (1929–1939)
 Eero Selin (1940–1941)
 Ole Edgren (1941–1962)
 Jorma Panula (1963–1965)
 Paavo Rautio (1965–1974)
 Pertti Pekkanen (1974–1986)
 Igor Bezrodnyi (1986–1990)
 Jacques Mercier (1990–1995)
 Hannu Lintu (1998–2001)
 Tibor Bogányi (2003–2006)
 Petri Sakari (2007–2011)
 Leif Segerstam (2012–2019)
 Olli Mustonen (2021–present)

References

External links
 Turku Philharmonic Orchestra official English website
 Turku Philharmonic Orchestra on Suosio (Association of Finnish Symphony Orchestras)
 David Hurwitz, 'More Excellent Rare Sibelius from Segerstam on Naxos'.  Review from ClassicsToday.com
 Paul Corfield Godfrey, September 2015 review, MusicWeb International page
 Colin Anderson, 'Sibelius’s music for Scaramouche – Turku Philharmonic Orchestra/Leif Segerstam [Naxos]'.  Classical Source website, June 2016

Finnish orchestras
Culture in Turku
1790 establishments in Finland
Musical groups established in the 18th century
Tourist attractions in Turku